Elymus pungens, the sea couch grass, is a species of grass of the genus Elymus in the family Poaceae. It is a common grass species native to Europe and Asia. Elymus pungens is typically found in sandy, and saline environments and can tolerate harsh weather conditions; because of this it is a common pioneer species typically associated with sand dunes.

References

pungens
Halophytes
Salt marsh plants
Bunchgrasses of Asia
Flora of Europe
Bunchgrasses of Europe
Plants described in 1817